"The April Witch" is a 1952 fantasy short story by American writer Ray Bradbury.

Plot summary
Cecy is a 17-year-old girl born into a magical family. She has the ability to assimilate with other living plants or animals. Purely benevolent and innocent in nature, Cecy tells her parents that she wishes to feel love, despite their warning that she will lose her magical abilities if she marries a human. She does not heed their warning and merges her essence with a young woman named Ann. She forces Ann to attend a dance with Tom, a 22-year-old man who has been interested in her for a while. However, Ann has no interest in Tom. Tom is aware of Ann's inconsistent behaviour during the dance. The story ends with Cecy becoming attracted to Tom and trying to arrange a meeting with Tom and her human form through Ann.

Reception
Boucher and McComas described the story as one of Bradbury's "reassuringly lovely flights of fancy".

Publication history
The story was included in several of Bradbury's short story collections:

 The Golden Apples of the Sun, 1953
 Twice 22, 1966
 The Stories of Ray Bradbury, 1980
 Ray Bradbury Collected Short Stories, 2001

This story was later assimilated into Bradbury's 2003 fix-up novel From the Dust Returned.

References

Footnotes

Bibliography

External links
 

1952 short stories
Short stories by Ray Bradbury
Fantasy short stories
Witchcraft in written fiction
Works originally published in The Saturday Evening Post